Lemuel G. Brandenbury (fl. 1840s–1850s) was the first chief justice of the Supreme Court of the Utah Territory in 1851. Various sources also spell his last name as Bradenbury, Bradenburg, or Brandeberg.

Little is known about Brandenbury except that he was from Pennsylvania, and that he had on one occasion "made a speech on the courthouse steps in Carlisle, Pennsylvania".
 
Brandenbury was appointed to the territorial court by President Millard Fillmore on March 12, 1851, after Joseph Buffington declined the position due to insufficient compensation. Brandenbury was the first non-Mormon territorial official to arrive, and was honored by a banquet and several dances. Brigham Young described Brandenbury as "an inconspicuous lawyer", and despite the initial good relations, Brandenbury himself quickly found himself feeling unwelcome in Utah, returning to Washington with the other non-Mormon members of the territorial government as one of the "Runaway Officials of 1851" to denounce the local government in the territory. Brandenbury did not return to the territory thereafter. Five years later, Young asserted in a speech that Brandenbury had been doing odd legal jobs in Washington, D.C., to make a living, and would have fared better had he stayed in the territory.

References

19th-century American judges
Chief Justices of the Utah Supreme Court
United States Article I federal judges appointed by Millard Fillmore
Date of birth unknown
Date of death unknown
Year of birth missing
Year of death missing
People from Carlisle, Pennsylvania